Song Se-ra (born 6 September 1993) is a South Korean left-handed épée fencer, 2022 team Asian champion, 2022 individual world champion, and 2021 team Olympic silver medalist.

Medal Record

Olympic Games

World Championship

Asian Championship

Grand Prix

World Cup

References

1993 births
Living people
Sportspeople from Busan
Fencers at the 2020 Summer Olympics
South Korean female fencers
Olympic fencers of South Korea
Olympic medalists in fencing
Medalists at the 2020 Summer Olympics
Olympic silver medalists for South Korea
Left-handed fencers
21st-century South Korean women
World Fencing Championships medalists